Ylldren Ibrahimaj (born 24 December 1995) is a professional footballer who plays for Norwegian club Lillestrøm. His primary position is a winger, but he can also play as an attacking or central midfielder. Born in Norway, Ibrahimaj represents Kosovo internationally.

Club career

Early career and Mjøndalen
Ibrahimaj was part of the youth team of IK Grane until December 2011. While from 2012, he played for the club of his birthplace, Arendal for five years and made 129 league appearances and scored fourteen goals.

On 22 December 2017, Ibrahimaj signed a four-year contract with 1. divisjon club Mjøndalen. On 2 April 2018, he made his debut against Florø after being named in the starting line-up and scored his side's only goal during a 1–1 home draw.

Viking

On 20 July 2018, Ibrahimaj joined 1. divisjon side Viking, on a two and a half year contract. Two days later, he made his debut in a 4–1 home win against Jerv after coming on as a substitute at 77th minute in place of Usman Sale.

Ural Yekaterinburg
On 16 January 2021, Ibrahimaj signed a three-year contract with Russian Premier League club Ural Yekaterinburg and received squad number 17. On 28 February 2021, he made his debut in a 2–2 away draw against Krasnodar after being named in the starting line-up.

Lillestrøm
On 7 February 2022, Ibrahimaj signed a three-year contract with Eliteserien club Lillestrøm and received squad number 20.

International career
On 22 May 2019, Ibrahimaj received a call-up from Kosovo for the UEFA Euro 2020 qualifying matches against Montenegro and Bulgaria, but he was not available for these matches after FIFA did not permit him to play for Kosovo due to problems with his documentation. His debut with Kosovo came on 13 January 2020 in a friendly match against Sweden after being named in the starting line-up.

Career statistics

Club

International

Honours

Club
Viking
1. divisjon: 2018
Norwegian Cup: 2019

Individual
Eliteserien Top assist provider: 2019

References

External links

1995 births
Living people
People from Arendal
Kosovan footballers
Kosovo international footballers
Kosovan expatriate footballers
Kosovan expatriate sportspeople in Russia
Norwegian footballers
Norwegian expatriate footballers
Norwegian expatriate sportspeople in Russia
Norwegian people of Kosovan descent
Norwegian people of Albanian descent
Association football midfielders
Norwegian Third Division players
Norwegian Second Division players
Norwegian First Division players
Eliteserien players
Arendal Fotball players
Mjøndalen IF players
Viking FK players
Lillestrøm SK players
Russian Premier League players
FC Ural Yekaterinburg players
Sportspeople from Agder